The 1931 New Jersey gubernatorial election was held on November 3, 1931. Democratic nominee A. Harry Moore defeated Republican nominee David Baird Jr. with 57.82% of the vote.

Republican primary

Candidates
 David Baird Jr.

Withdrew
 Robert Carey, Jersey City judge and candidate for Governor in 1928

General election

Candidates
John J. Ballam (Communist)
David Baird Jr. (Republican)
Owen M. Bruner (Prohibition)
John C. Butterworth (Socialist Labor)
Edmund R. Halsey (Independent)
John A. Kelly (Taxpayers)
A. Harry Moore (Democratic)
Herman F. Niessner (Socialist)

Results

References

1931
New Jersey
Gubernatorial
November 1931 events